Derotmema saussureanum, or Saussure's desert grasshopper, is a species of band-winged grasshopper in the family Acrididae. It is known from southern California south to northern Baja California Sur.

References

Oedipodinae
Articles created by Qbugbot
Insects described in 1901